Lieutenant General Sir William Wyndham Green  (15 May 1887 – 12 November 1979) was General Officer Commanding-in-Chief, Anti-Aircraft Command.

Military career
Educated at Malvern College and the Royal Military Academy, Woolwich, Green was commissioned into the Royal Artillery in 1907.

He served in World War I latterly as a brigade major in France. He was awarded the Military Cross for correcting gunfire from the top of a haystack 200 yards from the enemy front line in December 1914, and a bar to the MC, the citation for which reads:

He also received the Distinguished Service Order at Ploegsteert in April the following year. The DSO's citation reads:

After attending the Staff College, Camberley, from 1919 to 1920, in 1926 he became an instructor in Gunnery at the School of Artillery. In 1929 he went to India and served on the North West Frontier, before returning to the School of Artillery in 1937 as Chief Instructor for Equipment. In 1938 he was appointed Commandant at the Royal Military College of Science.

He served in World War II initially as Brigadier Royal Artillery at Northern Command and then, from March 1941 to October 1941, as Second in Command City and Garrison of Gibraltar. In 1942 he became Commander of 3rd Anti-Aircraft Division and in 1943 he was made Commander of 5th and 6th Anti-Aircraft Groups.

After the War he was appointed General Officer Commanding-in-Chief at Anti-Aircraft Command; he retired in 1946. He was also a Colonel Commandant of the Royal Artillery from 1947 to 1952.

The family home was at Little Gables in New Romney in Kent. He was a Deputy Lieutenant for the county in 1949.

Family
In January 1916 he married Madge Alexandra Bellairs and had one daughter, then in 1924 he married Aline Hope Primrose Cobbold and they went on to have one son and a daughter.

Bibliography

References

External links
Generals of World War II

 

1887 births
1979 deaths
British Army generals of World War II
British Army personnel of World War I
Anti-Aircraft Command officers
Knights Commander of the Order of the British Empire
Companions of the Order of the Bath
Companions of the Distinguished Service Order
Recipients of the Military Cross
Royal Artillery officers
Graduates of the Royal Military Academy, Woolwich
Graduates of the Staff College, Camberley
Deputy Lieutenants of Kent
People educated at Malvern College
British Army lieutenant generals
People from South Kensington
Military personnel from London